The Shah Shah ordered Gholam Reza Azhari at 5 November 1978 to lead the military government at the time of growing protests in the country. The selection of General Azhari was taken as an indirect signal to the revolutionaries that the regime had lost its resolve to resist and play it tough. The cabinet was officially formed on 6 November.

Of the eleven cabinet ministers appointed by Azhari, only six were military, and even this number was whittled down in the following weeks. The military cabinet members, for the most part, had no experience in their respective areas of responsibility. In short, the hotly debated change to a military government was, in practice, more cosmetic than real.

Among Azhari's first acts were the arrest and imprisonment of former Prime Minister Hoveida, the former head of SAVAK, the former head of the national police, the former mayor of Tehran and several more former ministers and high dignitaries. These wanton acts were again carried out in the hope of appeasing the revolutionaries.

On the eve of 20 December, Prime Minister Gholam Reza Azhari suffered a massive heart attack. He tendered his resignation to the Shah on 31 December 1978.

Cabinet 
Cabinet members were as follows:

|-
!colspan=6|
|-

See also 
 Iranian Revolution

References

External links

1978 establishments in Iran
1978 disestablishments in Iran
Iran
Iran
Azhari